The Port Republic Road Historic District is a national historic district in Waynesboro, Virginia.  In 2002, it included 83 buildings deemed to contribute to the historic character of the area, plus one other contributing structure and one contributing site, a foundation.  They include buildings such as houses, garages, sheds, commercial buildings, churches, and meeting halls, and structures such as carports and animal sheds.  The historically African-American neighborhood developed after the American Civil War.  Notable buildings include the Shiloh Baptist Church (1924), the early-20th century Elks and Abraham lodges, the Rosenwald School, which incorporates a 1938-39 auditorium/gymnasium, and Tarry's Hotel (1940).

It was listed on the National Register of Historic Places in 2002.

See also
Tree Streets Historic District (Waynesboro, Virginia)
Waynesboro Downtown Historic District

References

African-American history of Virginia
Historic districts on the National Register of Historic Places in Virginia
Buildings and structures in Waynesboro, Virginia
National Register of Historic Places in Waynesboro, Virginia